Gästriklands Folkblad was a communist newspaper published thrice weekly in Sandviken, Sweden from July 1921 to August 1922. Karl Gustaf Ragnar Almgren was the editor of the paper.

References

1921 establishments in Sweden
1922 disestablishments in Sweden
Communist newspapers published in Sweden
Defunct newspapers published in Sweden
Left Party (Sweden)
Mass media in Sandviken
Newspapers established in 1921
Publications disestablished in 1922
Swedish-language newspapers